The noble savage is a literary stock character who embodies the concept of the indigene, outsider, wild human, or "other" who has not been "corrupted by civilization, and therefore symbolizes humanity's innate goodness.

Noble Savage may also refer to:

 Noble Savage (album), 1985 album by American heavy metal band Virgin Steele
 Noble Savage (film), 2018 Israeli drama film
 The Noble Savage (magazine), American literary magazine, 1960–1962
 The Noble Savage: Allegory of Freedom, 1990 book by Stelio Cro
 The Noble Savage: Jean-Jacques Rousseau, 1754–1762, 1991 biography by Maurice Cranston, second volume of three